Bruce Albert Anderson (born January 18, 1944) is a former American football defensive end in the National Football League for the Washington Redskins, Los Angeles Rams, and New York Giants.  Bruce played High School football for Marshfield High School and college football at Willamette University and was drafted in the sixth round of the 1966 NFL Draft. At Willamette he was an All-American and in 2001 was inducted into the schools athletic hall of fame.

References

1944 births
Living people
Washington Redskins players
New York Giants players
Los Angeles Rams players
American football linebackers
Willamette Bearcats football players
People from Coos Bay, Oregon
Players of American football from Oregon